Solnhofen is a municipality in the district of Weißenburg-Gunzenhausen in the region of Middle Franconia in the  of Bavaria in Germany.  It is in the Altmühl valley.

The local area is famous in geology and palaeontology for Solnhofen limestone.  This is a very fine-grained limestone from the Jurassic period Lagerstätte that preserves detailed fossil specimens.  Alois Senefelder used specially prepared blocks of the fine Solnhofen limestone for the process of lithography which he invented in 1798. The quarrying of this lithographic limestone subsequently yielded spectacular finds, including Archaeopteryx, commemorated in the bird's full name Archaeopteryx lithographica. All 13 known specimens have come from the Solnhofen area.

Geography
Solnhofen is located on the Altmühl in Bavaria. It contains two districts: Hochholz and Eßlingen. It is adjacent to the municipalities Pappenheim, Langenaltheim, and Mörnsheim.

History

Solnhofen was known as "Husen" in the eighth century. In 750/51 Saint Solus created a church there. His grave church (Sola-Basilika) was later built on the site. In honor of him Husen was renamed "Solnhofen".  In 1420 Solnhofen was burnt down during the Bavarian War.  It also suffered through the Thirty Years' War.  From 1649 to the 18th century there was a glass industry in Solnhofen.  In 1785 the St Veit church was erected partly on the ruins of the old grave church. In 1870 the train station was opened.  From 1903 to 1905 the Catholic St Sola church was built.  In 1970 the Bürgermeister-Müller-Museum was opened.

Sights

The Sola Basilica dating from the Carolingian period is one of the finest architectural monuments in Germany. It is the grave church of Saint Solus. Close to it is the St Veit church that was built in 1785.

As well as celebrating its role as the "hometown" of Archaeopteryx, Solnhofen also commemorates the work of Alois Senefelder with a statue of the inventor by 

The Bürgermeister Müller Museum in Solnhofen displays the history of lithography, the story of the limestone quarries, and the spectacular fossil finds from the area, including the most recently discovered Archaeopteryx specimen.

The Catholic St Sola church, built in early Gothic style of Jurassic limestones, was opened in 1905.

Notable people
 Richard Arauner (1902-1936), Oberführer in the Waffen-SS
 Hermann von Meyer (1801-1869)

References

External links

 
 Solnhofen fossils
 Bürgermeister Müller Museum

Weißenburg-Gunzenhausen